There have been three Battles of Bạch Đằng recorded in the history of Vietnam:
Battle of Bạch Đằng (938) between the Vietnamese commanded by Ngô Quyền and troops of the Southern Han.  This battle resulted in the complete independence of Vietnam from Chinese rule.
Battle of Bạch Đằng (981) between the Vietnamese army commanded by Lê Hoàn and troops of the Song Dynasty.
Battle of Bạch Đằng (1288) between the Vietnamese army commanded by Trần Hưng Đạo and troops of the Yuan Dynasty, resulting in a Vietnamese victory.

Battles involving Vietnam